The Dioscoreales are an order of monocotyledonous flowering plants in modern classification systems, such as the Angiosperm Phylogeny Group and the Angiosperm Phylogeny Web.  Within the monocots Dioscoreales are grouped in the lilioid monocots, where they are in a sister group relationship with the Pandanales. The Dioscoreales must contain the family Dioscoreaceae which includes the yam (Dioscorea), some species of which are an important food source in many regions. Older systems tended to place all lilioid monocots with reticulate veined leaves (such as Smilacaceae and Stemonaceae together with Dioscoraceae) in Dioscoreales. As currently circumscribed by phylogenetic analysis using combined morphology and molecular methods, Dioscreales contains many reticulate veined vines in Dioscoraceae, it also includes the myco-heterotrophic Burmanniaceae and the autotrophic Nartheciaceae. The order consists of three families, 22 genera and about 850 species.

Description
Dioscoreales are vines or herbaceous forest floor  plants. They may be achlorophyllous or saprophytic. Synapomorphies include tuberous roots, glandular hairs, seed coat characteristics and the presence of calcium oxalate crystals. Other characteristics of the order include the presence of saponin steroids, annular vascular bundles that are found in both the stem and leaf. The leaves are often unsheathed at the base, have a distinctive petiole and reticulate veined lamina. Alternatively they may be small and scale-like with a sheathed base. The flowers are actinomorphic, and may be bisexual or dioecious, while the flowers or inflorescence bear glandular hairs. The perianth may be conspicuous or reduced and the style is short with well developed style branches. The tepals persist in the development of the fruit, which is a dry capsule or berry. In the seed, the endotegmen  is tanniferous and the embryo short.

All of the species except the genera placed in Nartheciaceae express simultaneous microsporogenesis. Plants in Nartheciaceae show successive microsporogenesis which is one of the traits indicating that the family is sister to all the other members included in the order.

Taxonomy

Pre-Darwinian 
For the early history from Lindley (1853) onwards, see Caddick et al. (2000) Table 1, Caddick et al. (2002a) Table 1 and Table 2 in Bouman (1995). The taxonomic classification of Dioscoreales has been complicated by the presence of a number of morphological features reminiscent of the dicotyledons, leading some authors to place the order as intermediate between the monocotyledons and the dicotyledons.

While Lindley did not use the term "Dioscoreales", he placed the family Dioscoraceae together with four other families in what he referred to as an Alliance (the equivalent of the modern Order) called Dictyogens. He reflected the uncertainty as to the place of this Alliance by placing it as a class of its own between Endogens (monocots) and Exogens (dicots) The botanical authority is given to von Martius (1835) by APG for his description of the family Dioscoreae or Ordo, while other sources cite Hooker (Dioscoreales Hook.f.) for his use of the term "Dioscorales" in 1873 with a single family, Dioscoreae. However, in his more definitive work, the Genera plantara (1883), he simply placed Dioscoraceae in the Epigynae "Series".

Post-Darwinian
Although Charles Darwin's Origin of Species (1859) preceded Bentham and Hooker's publication, the latter project was commenced much earlier and George Bentham was initially sceptical of Darwinism. The new phyletic approach changed the way that taxonomists considered plant classification, incorporating evolutionary information into their schemata, but this did little to further define the circumscription of Dioscoreaceae. The major works in the late nineteenth and early twentieth century employing this approach were in the German literature. Authors such as Eichler, Engler and Wettstein  placed this family in the Liliiflorae, a major subdivision of monocotyledons. it remained to Hutchinson (1926) to resurrect the Dioscoreales to group Dioscoreaceae and related families together. Hutchinson's circumscription of Dioscoreales included three other families in addition to Dioscoreaceae, Stenomeridaceae, Trichopodaceae and Roxburghiaceae. Of these only Trichopodaceae was included in the Angiosperm Phylogeny Group (APG) classification (see below), but was subsumed into Dioscoraceae. Stenomeridaceae, as Stenomeris was also included in Dioscoreaceae as subfamily Stenomeridoideae, the remaining genera being grouped in subfamily Dioscoreoideae. Roxburghiaceae on the other hand was segregated in the sister order Pandanales as Stemonaceae. Most taxonomists in the twentieth century (the exception was the 1981 Cronquist system which  placed most such plants in order Liliales, subclass Liliidae, class Liliopsida=monocotyledons, division Magnoliophyta=angiosperms) recognised Dioscoreales as a distinct order, but demonstrated wide variations in its composition.

Dahlgren, in the second version of his taxonomic classification (1982) raised the Liliiflorae to a superorder and placed Dioscoreales as an order within it. In his system, Dioscoreales contained only three families, Dioscoreaceae, Stemonaceae (i.e. Hutchinson's Roxburghiaceae) and Trilliaceae. The latter two families had been treated as a separate order (Stemonales, or Roxburghiales) by other authors, such as Huber (1969). The APG would later assign these to Pandanales and Liliales respectively. Dahlgren's construction of Dioscoreaceae included the Stenomeridaceae and Trichopodaceae, doubting these were distinct, and Croomiaceae in Stemonaceae. Furthermore, he expressed doubts about the order's homogeneity, especially Trilliaceae. The Dioscoreales at that time were marginally distinguishable from the Asparagales. In his examination of Huber's Stemonales, he found that the two constituent families had as close an affinity to Dioscoreaceae as to each other, and hence included them. He also considered closely related families and their relationship to Dioscoreales, such as the monogeneric Taccaceae, then in its own order, Taccales. Similar considerations were discussed with respect to two Asparagales families, Smilacaceae and Petermanniaceae.

In Dahlgren's third and final version (1985) that broader circumscription of Dioscoreales was created within the superorder Lilianae, subclass Liliidae (monocotyledons), class Magnoliopsida (angiosperms) and comprised the seven families Dioscoreaceae, Petermanniaceae, Smilacaceae, Stemonaceae, Taccaceae, Trichopodaceae and Trilliaceae. Thismiaceae has either been treated as a separate family closely related to Burmanniaceae or as a tribe (Thismieae) within a more broadly defined Burmanniaceae, forming a separate order, Burmanniales, in the Dahlgren system. The related Nartheciaceae were treated as tribe Narthecieae within the Melanthiaceae in a third order, the Melanthiales, by Dahlgren. Dahlgren considered the Dioscoreales to most strongly resemble the ancestral monocotyledons, and hence sharing "dicotyledonous" characteristics, making it the most central monocotyledon order. Of these seven families, Bouman considered Dioscoreaceae, Trichopodaceae, Stemonaceae and Taccaceae to represent the "core" families of the order. However, that study also indicated both a clear delineation of the order from other orders particularly Asparagales, and a lack of homogeneity within the order.

Molecular phylogenetics and the Angiosperm Phylogeny Group 
The increasing availability of molecular phylogenetics methods in addition to morphological characteristics in the 1990s led to major reconsiderations of the relationships within the monocotyledons. In that large multi-institutional examination of the seed plants using the plastid gene rbcL the authors used Dahlgren's system as their basis, but followed Thorne (1992) in altering the suffixes of the superorders from "-iflorae" to "-anae". This demonstrated that the Lilianae comprised three lineages corresponding to Dahlgren's orders Dioscoreales, Liliales, and Asparagaless.

Under the Angiosperm Phylogeny Group system of 1998, which took Dahlgren's system as a basis, the order was placed in the monocot clade  and comprised the five families Burmanniaceae, Dioscoreaceae, Taccaceae, Thismiaceae and Trichopodaceae.

In APG II (2003), a number of changes were made to Dioscoreales, as a result of an extensive study by Caddick and colleagues (2002), using an analysis of three genes, rbcL, atpB and 18S rDNA, in addition to morphology. These studies resulted in a re-examination of the relationships between most of the genera within the order. Thismiaceae was shown to be a sister group to Burmanniaceae, and so was included in it. The monotypic families Taccaceae and Trichopodaceae were included in Dioscoreaceae, while Nartheciaceae could also be grouped within Dioscoreales. APG III (2009) did not change this, so the order now comprises three families Burmanniaceae, Dioscoreaceae and Nartheciaceae.

Although further research on the deeper relationships within Dioscoreales continues, the APG IV (2016) authors felt it was still premature to propose a restructuring of the order. Specifically these issues involve conflicting information as to the relationship between Thismia and Burmanniaceae, and hence whether Thismiaceae should be subsumed in the latter, or reinstated.

Phylogeny 
Molecular phylogenetics in Dioscoreales poses special problems due to the absence of plastid genes in mycoheterotrophs. Dioscoreales is monophyletic and is placed as a sister order to Pandanales, as shown in Cladogram I.

Evolution 
The data for the evolution of the order is collected from molecular analyses since there are no such fossils found. It is estimated that Dioscoreales and its sister clade Pandanales split up around 121 million years ago during Early Cretaceous when the stem group was formed. Then it took 3 to 6 million years for the crown group to differentiate in Mid Cretaceous.

Subdivision 
The three families of Dioscreales constitutes about 22 genera and about 849 species making it one of the smaller monocot orders. Of these, the largest group is Dioscorea (yams) with about 450 species. By contrast the second largest genus is Burmannia with about 60 species, and most have only one or two.

Some authors, preferring the original APG (1998)families, continue to treat Thismiaceae separately from Burmanniaceae and Taccaceae from Dioscoreaceae. But in the 2015 study of Hertwerk and colleagues, seven genera representing all three families were examined with an eight gene dataset. Dioscoreales was monophyletic and three subclades were represented corresponding to the APG families. Dioscoreaceae and Burmanniaceae were in a sister group relationship.

Etymology 
Named after the type genus Dioscorea, which in turn was named by Linnaeus in 1753 to honour the Greek physician and botanist Dioscorides.

Distribution and habitat
Species from this order are distributed across all of the continents except Antarctica. They are mainly tropical or subtropical representatives, but some members of families Dioscoreaceae and Nartheciaceae are found in cooler regions of Europe and North America. Order Dioscoreales contains plants that are able to form an underground organ for reservation of nutritions as many other monocots. An exception is the family Burmanniaceae which is entirely myco-heterotrophic and contains species that lack photosynthetic abilities.

Ecology

The three families included in order Dioscoreales also represent three different ecological groups of plants. Dioscoreaceae contains mainly vines (Dioscorea) and other crawling species (Epipetrum). Nartheciaceae on the other hand is a family composed of herbaceous plants with a rather lily-like appearance (Aletris) while Burmanniaceae is entirely myco-heterotrophic group.

Uses 
Many members of Dioscoreaceae produce tuberous starchy roots (yams) which form staple foods in tropical regions. They have also been the source of steroids for the pharmaceutical industry, including the production of oral contraceptives.

Notes

References

Bibliography

Articles and chapters 
 , In 
 , In 
 Excerpts
 
 
 
 
 
 
 
 
 
 
 
 , In

Books and symposia

Databases

APG

External links
 Dioscoreales: Air potatoes and Bat flowers
 Kress WJ. Dioscoreales. Encyclopædia Britannica 2016

 
Angiosperm orders
Extant Aptian first appearances